Ewart is both a given name and a surname. Notable people with the name include:

Given name
 Ewart Adamson (1882–1945), Scottish screenwriter
 Ewart Astill (1888–1948), English Test cricketer
 Ewart Brown (born 1946), Premier of Bermuda
 Ewart Grogan (1874–1967), British explorer, politician, and entrepreneur
 Ewart John Arlington Harnum (1910–1996), Canadian businessman and Lieutenant-Governor of Newfoundland and Labrador
 Ewart Horsfall (1892–1974), British rower
 Ewart Milne (1903–1987), Irish poet
 Ewart Oakeshott (1916–2002), British illustrator, collector, and amateur historian

Surname
 Alfred James Ewart (1872–1937), English-Australian botanist
 Charles Ewart (1769–1846), Scottish soldier
 David Ewart (20th century), Canadian architect
 Douglas Ewart (born 1946), multi-instrumentalist and instrument builder
 Ewa Ewart, Polish documentary film maker
 Frank Ewart (1876–1947) Oneness Pentecostal Preacher and author
 Gavin Ewart (1916–1995), British poet
 Hamilton G. Ewart (1849–1918), member of the United States House of Representatives
 Ivan Ewart (1919–1995), Northern Irish naval officer, businessman and charity worker
 J. S. Ewart (1849–1933), Canadian lawyer and author
 James Cossar Ewart (1851–1933), zoologist
 James Oliver Ewart (1917-1945), British arm officer
 John Albert Ewart (20th century), Canadian architect
 John Ewart (doctor) 18581939, New Zealand surgeon
 John Ewart (1928–1994), Australian actor
 John Ewart (architect) (1788–1856), Canadian architect and businessman
 Peter Ewart (1767–1842), British engineer
 Spencer Ewart (1861–1930), British army officer
 William Ewart (disambiguation)

See also
 Ewert
 D'Ewart
 Ewart, Manitoba
 Ewart baronets
 Ewart Building
 Ewart College
 Ewart-Biggs
 C.S.I. Ewart Matriculation Higher Secondary School